This is a list of people with the surname Lloyd.

A 
Albert Lancaster Lloyd (1908–1982), English ethnomusicologist
Alex Lloyd (born 1974), Australian singer-songwriter
Alex Lloyd (born 1984), IndyCar race driver
Alice Spencer Geddes Lloyd (1876–1962), American social reformer
Andrew Lloyd Webber, Baron Lloyd-Webber (born 1948), English composer of musical theatre
Anthony Lloyd (born 1984), English footballer

B 
Benjamin Lloyd (1839–after 1865), Coal Heaver in the Union Navy during the American Civil War
Bertram Lloyd (1881–1944), English naturalist, humanitarian, vegetarian and campaigner for animal rights
Bill Lloyd, American soccer coach
Blake Lloyd, Canadian engineer
Bobby Lloyd ( 1888–1930), Welsh international rugby union player

C 
Cariad Lloyd (born 1982), British actress and comedian
Carli Lloyd (born 1982), American soccer player
Carli Lloyd (volleyball) (born 1989), American volleyball player
Charles W. Lloyd (1915–1999), educationalist and headmaster of Dulwich College
Cher Lloyd (born 1993), English singer
Christopher Lloyd (born 1938), American character actor
Christopher Lloyd (born 1960), American TV writer and producer
Clive Lloyd (born 1944), West Indian cricketer
Colin Lloyd (born 1973], English darts player
Connie Lloyd (1895-1982), artist from New Zealand who specialised in etching
Constance Lloyd (1859–1898), English author

D 
Daniel Lloyd (born 1980), English professional road racing cyclist
Daniel Lloyd (born 1982), bilingual Welsh actor and singer-songwriter
Daniel Lloyd (born 1992), British racing car driver
Daniel B. Lloyd, retired United States Coast Guard Rear Admiral
Danielle Lloyd (born 1983), British glamour model
Danny Lloyd (born 1973), American child actor
David Lloyd (born 1948), former professional tennis player and founder of the David Lloyd Tennis Clubs
David Lloyd George, 1st Earl Lloyd George of Dwyfor (1863–1945), British politician and prime minister
Dennis Lloyd (born 1993), Israeli singer and music producer
Dennis Lloyd, Baron Lloyd of Hampstead (1915–1992), British jurist and peer

E 
Edward LLoyd
Edward Lloyd ( 1648–1713), first proprietor of Lloyd's Coffee House in London
Edward Lloyd (1670–1718), British colonial governor of Maryland
Edward Lloyd (1744–1796), Maryland delegate to the Continental Congress
Edward Lloyd (1779–1834), governor of The U.S. state of Maryland
Edward Lhuyd (1660–1709), Welsh naturalist, botanist, linguist, geographer and antiquary
Elizabeth Jane Lloyd (1928–1995), British artist
 Emily Lloyd
Emily Ann Lloyd, (born 1984), American actress
Emily Lloyd (born 1970), English actress
Emily Lloyd (chemist) (1860–1912), English chemist
Emily Lloyd (curler), (born 1996), Canadian curler
Emily Lloyd-Saini, British comedian, writer and actress 
Ernest Marsh Lloyd (1840–1922), British soldier and historian
Errol Lloyd (born 1943), Jamaican-born artist, writer and art critic
Etta Belle Lloyd (1860–1929), American civic leader

F 
Frank Lloyd (1886–1960), English/American film director and producer
Frank Lloyd (born 1952), British horn player and teacher
Frank Lloyd III (1929–1995), Australian actor
Frank Lloyd Wright (1867–1959), American architect

G 
Gareth David-Lloyd (born 1981), Welsh actor
Gaylord Lloyd (1888–1943), American actor
Genevieve Lloyd (born 1941), Australian philosopher and feminist
Geoff Lloyd, (born 1973), British radio DJ
Geoffrey Lloyd, Baron Geoffrey-Lloyd (1902–1984), British Conservative Party politician
George Lloyd (archaeologist) (1820–1885), British priest and archaeologist
George Lloyd (bishop of Chester) (1560–1615), Welsh Anglican bishop
George Lloyd (bishop of Saskatchewan) (1861–1940), Anglican bishop and theologian
George Lloyd (composer) (1913–1998), British late-Romantic composer
George Lloyd (politician) (1815–1897), member for Newcastle, New South Wales
George Ambrose Lloyd, 1st Baron Lloyd (1879–1941), British High Commissioner of Egypt
Gordon W. Lloyd (1832–1905), English/American architect
Gweneth Lloyd (1901–1993), cofounder of Royal Winnipeg Ballet
Gwilym Lloyd George (1894–1967), British politician

H 
Harold Lloyd (1893–1971), American actor and filmmaker known for his silent film comedies
Henry Lloyd (1852–1920), governor of Maryland
Henry Lloyd (1911–2001), Anglican priest
Henry Lloyd ( 1718–1783), Welsh army officer and military writer
Henry Demarest Lloyd (1847–1903), American journalist
Henry J. Lloyd (1794–1853), English amateur cricketer
Hiram Lloyd (1863-1942), lieutenant governor of the U.S. state of Missouri
H. S. Lloyd (1887–1963), British dog breeder

J 
Jake Lloyd (born 1989), American actor
James Lloyd (disambiguation), multiple people
Jess Lloyd (born 1995), British swimmer
Jessica Raine (born 1982), real name Jessica Lloyd, English actress
Jim Lloyd (born 1954), Australian politician
John Lloyd (born 1954), British tennis player
John Lloyd (born 1943), former head coach to Wales national rugby union team
John M. Lloyd (1835–1892), American police officer, tavern owner, and bricklayer, known for testifying in the Abraham Lincoln assassination conspiracy trials
Josie Lloyd (1940–2020), American actress
Julian Lloyd Webber (born 1951), composer, cellist & brother of Andrew Lloyd Webber

K 
Kanoa Lloyd (born 1986), television and radio presenter from New Zealand
Kyle Lloyd (born 1990), American baseball player

L 
Larry Lloyd (born 1948), English footballer
Lewis Lloyd (1959–2019), American basketball player
Llewellyn Lloyd (1877–1958), Welsh international rugby union player
Lucy Lloyd (1834–1914) creator along with Wilhelm Bleek of the 19th century archive of ǀXam and !kun texts

M 
Marilyn Lloyd (1929-2018), American politician
Mary Helen Wingate Lloyd (1868–1934), American horticulturist
Marie Lloyd (1870–1922), music hall singer
Matthew Lloyd (born 1978), Australian rules footballer and Coleman Medallist

N 
Nicholas Lloyd (born 1942), British journalist
Norman Lloyd (disambiguation), multiple people

P 
Patrick Lloyd (2004- until), High school shot put and discus thrower.
Peggy Lloyd (1913–2011), American stage actress
Percy Lloyd (1871–1959), Wales national rugby player
Peter Lloyd (born 1966), Australian journalist

R 
Rachel Lloyd (1839-1900), American chemist
Raymond Lloyd (born 1964), American professional wrestler better known as Glacier
Richard Lloyd (disambiguation), multiple people
Richard Hey Lloyd (born 1933), British organist and composer
Ridgway Robert Syers Christian Codner Lloyd (1842–1884), English physician and antiquary
Robert Lloyd (disambiguation), multiple people

S 
Sabrina Lloyd (born 1970), American actor
Sam Lloyd (1963–2020), American character actor and nephew of Christopher Lloyd
Sampson Lloyd (1699–1779), English iron manufacturer and co-founder Lloyds Bank
Samuel Loyd (1841–1911), American puzzle author and recreational mathematician
Sarah J. Lloyd (born 1896), Welsh artist
Selwyn Lloyd, Baron Selwyn-Lloyd (1904–1978) British politician and general
Seth Lloyd (born 1960), American professor of mechanical engineering at MIT
Seton Lloyd (1902–1996), British archaeologist
Sian Lloyd (born 1972), Welsh television news presenter
Siân Lloyd (born 1958), Welsh weather presenter
Suzanne Lloyd (born 1934), Canadian actress

T 
Terry Lloyd (1952–2003), British television journalist killed in Iraq
Thomas Lloyd (1756–1827), stenographer, known as the "father of American shorthand"
Tommy Lloyd (born 1974), American basketball coach

V 
 Vanessa Lloyd-Davies (1960–2005), British doctor, equestrian and soldier

W 
William Lloyd (disambiguation), multiple people

Surnames of Welsh origin
Celtic-language surnames
Surnames of British Isles origin
Lists of people by surname